Yaroslav "Yari" Mikhailovich Meykher (born 21 March 2000) is a Ukrainian footballer who plays for Spanish club Valladolid B as a goalkeeper.

Club career
Born in Tovste, Meykher joined RCD Espanyol's youth setup in 2015, from EFB Pinatar. He made his senior debut with the former's reserves on 8 April 2018, starting in a 1–2 Tercera División away loss against CE L'Hospitalet.

On 7 December 2018, after being only a third choice, Meykher was loaned to CE L'Hospitalet until the end of the season. The following July, he moved to UD Logroñés and was initially assigned to the B-team.

Meykher made his professional debut on 17 October 2020, starting in a 0–1 home loss against CD Leganés in the Segunda División.

References

External links

2000 births
Living people
Ukrainian footballers
Association football goalkeepers
Segunda División players
Tercera División players
RCD Espanyol B footballers
CE L'Hospitalet players
UD Logroñés players
Ukraine youth international footballers
Ukrainian expatriate footballers
Ukrainian expatriate sportspeople in Spain
Expatriate footballers in Spain
Sportspeople from Ternopil Oblast